During the 1995–96 English football season, Oldham Athletic A.F.C. competed in the Football League First Division.

Final league table

First-team squad
Squad at end of season

References

Notes

Oldham Athletic A.F.C. seasons
Oldham Athletic